The Europe Zone was one of the three regional zones of the 1969 Davis Cup.

32 teams entered the Europe Zone, competing across 2 sub-zones. The winners of each sub-zone went on to compete in the Inter-Zonal Zone against the winners of the Americas Zone and Eastern Zone.

Great Britain defeated South Africa in the Zone A final, and Romania defeated the Soviet Union in the Zone B final, resulting in both Great Britain and Romania progressing to the Inter-Zonal Zone.

Zone A

Draw

First round

West Germany vs. New Zealand

Finland vs. Sweden

Switzerland vs. Great Britain

Ireland vs. Luxembourg

Monaco vs. Bulgaria

Denmark vs. Czechoslovakia

Poland vs. Hungary

South Africa vs. Iran

Quarterfinals

Sweden vs. West Germany

Great Britain vs. Ireland

Monaco vs. Czechoslovakia

Semifinals

Great Britain vs. West Germany

Final

Great Britain vs. South Africa

Zone B

Draw

First round

Rhodesia vs. Spain

Yugoslavia vs. France

Romania vs. Egypt

Portugal vs. Israel

Greece vs. Soviet Union

Netherlands vs. Canada

Norway vs. Austria

Italy vs. Belgium

Quarterfinals

Yugoslavia vs. Spain

Romania vs. Israel

Soviet Union vs. Canada

Italy vs. Austria

Semifinals

Spain vs. Romania

Soviet Union vs. Italy

Final

Romania vs. Soviet Union

References

External links
Davis Cup official website

Davis Cup Europe/Africa Zone
Europe Zone
Davis Cup